The Republic of Uzbekistan competed at the 2017 Asian Indoor and Martial Arts Games in Ashgabat, Turkmenistan, from 17 to 27 September 2017.

Medalists

References

Nations at the 2017 Asian Indoor and Martial Arts Games
2017 in Uzbekistani sport